Boniface Oluoch Otieno (born 22 December 1986) is a Kenyan international footballer who plays for Gor Mahia, as a goalkeeper.

Career
Born in Nairobi, Oluoch has played club football for Tusker and Gor Mahia.

He made his international debut for Kenya in 2010.

References

1986 births
Living people
Footballers from Nairobi
Kenyan footballers
Association football goalkeepers
Kenya international footballers
Tusker F.C. players
Gor Mahia F.C. players
Kenyan Premier League players